Bradley Method may refer to:

Bradley method of bush regeneration
Bradley method of natural childbirth